Eric Quill (born February 28, 1978, in Missouri City, Texas) is an American soccer coach and former player.

Career

College
An outstanding youth soccer player, Quill was offered a contract by Ajax Amsterdam as a teenager, but declined the opportunity to go to Europe. He instead stayed in the United States, following the conventional route by going to Clemson University to play college soccer in 1996.  After scoring six goals and five assists as a freshman for the Tigers, however, Quill decided to go pro, signing a Project-40 contract with MLS.

Professional
Quill was allocated to the Tampa Bay Mutiny for the 1997 season, but saw little playing time.  After appearing extensively as a substitute in 1999, Quill finally broke into the team's starting lineup in 2000, when he started 25 games, registering five goals and eleven assists.  Quill returned and played just as well in 2001, finishing the year with two goals and eight assists in 23 starts.  The Mutiny were contracted at the end of 2001, however, and Quill was selected fourth overall by the Kansas City Wizards in the 2002 MLS Dispersal Draft.

Quill immediately stepped into the Wizards' left midfield position, but numerous injuries limited him to 13 starts and one assist on the season. Having recovered in 2003, Quill had a solid campaign, starting 25 games and scoring three goals and seven assists.  However, Quill was traded in the offseason to the Dallas Burn along with Carey Talley for Shavar Thomas. Quill had a disappointing season with the Burn, and although he beat out Brad Davis for his left midfield position, he only registered one goal and three assists on the year. He was let go by the club early in 2005 and signed with the MetroStars in August. Quill was released by the club in November 2005.

Unable to find a club, Quill turned to coaching, spending time as the assistant coach and recruiting coordinator with the women's soccer team at the University of Houston in 2007 and 2008.

In early 2009, Quill was coaxed out of semi-retirement to play in the Premier Development League for Houston Leones, where he was expected to lend his experience to the team's midfield.

International
Although he has been called up to camps, Quill has never played for the United States national team.  He has, however, played for the U-23, U-20, and U-16 sides.

Personal life
Quill is married to Susan Bush, former soccer player for the U.S. national team and current coach, who he worked with while the assistant of the Houston Cougars women's team.

References

External links
 University of Houston coaching bio 

1978 births
Living people
American soccer players
Clemson Tigers men's soccer players
Tampa Bay Mutiny players
Jacksonville Cyclones players
MLS Pro-40 players
Sporting Kansas City players
FC Dallas players
New York Red Bulls players
Houston Leones players
Soccer players from Texas
A-League (1995–2004) players
Major League Soccer players
USL League Two players
Association football midfielders
American soccer coaches
USL League One coaches